Echt was a German pop band from Flensburg active from 1997 to 2002. Their second album Freischwimmer charted as no. 1 in the German album charts in 1999.

Members 
 Kim Alexander Frank (Vocals)
 Kai Fischer (Guitar)
 Florian "Florst" Sump (Drums)
 Andreas "Puffi" Puffpaff (Bass guitar)
 Gunnar Astrup (Keyboards)

Discography

Albums 
 1998: Echt
 1999: Freischwimmer 
 1999: Live bei Overdrive
 1999: Echt präsentiert die Play it music school (2 CD + Songbook including chords for the guitar)
 2000: Recorder

Singles 
 1998: "Alles wird sich ändern"
 1998: "Wir habens getan"
 1998: "Wo bist Du jetzt?" (written by Michel van Dyke) 
 1999: "Fort von mir"
 1999: "Du trägst keine Liebe in dir" (written by Michel van Dyke)
 1999: "Weinst du"
 2000: "Junimond"
 2000: "2010"
 2001: "Wie geht es Dir so"
 2001: "Stehengeblieben"

Samplers 
 1999: POP 2000 / Das Gibts Nur Einmal (König von Deutschland)
 2000: Crazy, Original Soundtrack (Junimond)

DVD 
 2000: Crazy Platinum Edition (with 6 live videos, making of "Junimond", and "Junimond" music video)

References

External links 
 Official Website (German)
 ECHTonline: Echt Archive (German)
 Echt at laut.de (German)

German boy bands
People from Flensburg